Paraamblyseiulella is a genus of mites in the Phytoseiidae family.

Species
 Paraamblyseiulella transmontanus (Ueckermann & Loots, 1987)

References

Phytoseiidae